George Tebbetts may refer to:
George P. Tebbetts (1828–1909), California politician
Birdie Tebbetts (George Robert Tebbetts, 1912–1999), baseball player and figure